Aaron Joseph McGowan is an English professional footballer who plays as a right-back for Northampton Town. He has previously played for Kilmarnock, Morecambe and Hamilton Academical.

Career
McGowan made his professional debut for Morecambe during the 2012–13 season, becoming the youngest player in the club's history. On 19 May 2014, he signed a new two-year deal at the Globe Arena.

On 28 March 2015, McGowan scored his first professional career goal in an away game at Exeter City. The game finished 1–1 and the 18-year-old was named Man of The Match. At the end of the 2017–18 season, he won three awards at the club's end of season awards, picking up Player of the Year, Fans Player of the Year, and local newspaper Player of The Year. He turned down a three-year contract at the end of this season, opting to leave Morecambe having played 119 times in total for the club.

McGowan signed for Hamilton Academical in June 2018. He went on to make 38 appearances in his first season, picking up the club's Player of the Year and Fans player of the year awards in the process.

In the 2019–20 season McGowan was named vice-captain, going on to make 29 appearances, captaining the club on 10 occasions, most notably against Rangers at Ibrox in March 2020, as Hamilton won 1–0. He won the club's Player of the Year award for the second year running. He left the club at the end of the season, opting not to renew his contract.

In June 2020, McGowan moved to fellow Scottish Premiership club Kilmarnock having turned down a new contract at Hamilton.

On 12 July 2021, McGowan signed for Northampton Town on a two-year deal.

Education
McGowan studied at Maricourt RC High School In Maghull.

Career statistics

References

External links

English footballers
Living people
1996 births
Morecambe F.C. players
Hamilton Academical F.C. players
Kilmarnock F.C. players
Northampton Town F.C. players
English Football League players
Scottish Professional Football League players
Association football defenders